Akeem Antony Hinds (born 26 November 1999) is an English professional footballer who plays as a left-back for  club Stafford Rangers.

Career
Hinds was born in Sheffield and joined Sheffield United Academy as a 13-year-old. Hinds then switched to Rotherham United Rotherham United. at the age of 15 He made his professional debut in October 2017 in the EFL Trophy defeat to Chesterfield. In June 2018 he signed his first professional contract, a one-year deal following the conclusion of his scholarship.

Loans 
On 18 September 2018, he joined Northern Premier League Division One East side Frickley Athletic on a one-month youth loan. In March 2019, he was sent out on loan again to NPL Premier Division side Hyde United on a one-month loan deal. In May 2019, he signed a new one-year contract extension until 2020. In August 2019 he joined Bradford (Park Avenue) on loan until January 2020, but was recalled at the end of the month. In January 2020 he had his Rotherham United contract terminated by mutual consent and left the club.

Lincoln City 
Shortly after, Hinds signed for Lincoln City until the end of the 2020 season. On 28 May 2020, it was announced Hinds will leave the club at the end of his current contract.

Brackley Town 
Following his release from Lincoln City at the end of the 2019-2020 season, Hinds signed for National League North side Brackley Town on 27 November 2020.

Buxton
He signed for Northern Premier League Premier Division side Buxton on a free transfer in August 2021.

Return to Bradford
Hinds only had a brief spell at Buxton, but helped the club challenge at the top of the league and also contributed to their FA Cup run to the second round proper before he signed for Bradford (Park Avenue) on 7 January 2022, penning a short-term contract.

Northern Premier League
In October 2022, Hinds returned to the Northern Premier League to join Matlock Town. Having struggled to secure a first-team place, he signed for Stafford Rangers in December of the same year.

Career statistics

Club

References

External links
Akeem Hinds at Soccerway

1998 births
Footballers from Sheffield
Living people
Association football defenders
English footballers
English people of Jamaican descent
Rotherham United F.C. players
Lincoln City F.C. players
Frickley Athletic F.C. players
Hyde United F.C. players
Bradford (Park Avenue) A.F.C. players
Brackley Town F.C. players
Buxton F.C. players
Matlock Town F.C. players
Stafford Rangers F.C. players
National League (English football) players
Northern Premier League players